Members of 35th ISEA Bharati Team (2015-2017):
1.  Alfred
2.  Amit Deshmukh
3.  Ashutosh Chaudhary
4.  B Sudarshan Patro
5.  Bhagwati Prasad
6.  Birendra Sharma
7.  Brijesh Desai
8.  Girish Rathor
9.  Hanuman Yadaiah
10. Harbir Singh
11. Jyothish K J
12. Kaila Venkata Raghavendra
13. Mahesh Shrihari Darvatkar
14. Dr. Manoj Sain
15. Mohammed Shahid
16. Mohit Nirwan
17. Rohit B. Dehankar
18. Sai Satya Mohapatra
19. Shaik Mastan
20. Sharad B. Gursale
21. T R Pakki
22. Taufeeq Khan
23. Yashpal Singh

Indian expeditions to Antarctica
2015 in India